Borburata is a small coastal town in Carabobo state, Venezuela, located on the Caribbean Sea. It was long a destination of indigenous peoples, who would gather salt at the sea. It was colonized by the Spanish in the 16th century, but suffered so many raids that it was mostly abandoned. Residents moved inland. Today it has facilities associated with the Venezuela oil and gas industry.

History

For thousands of year, indigenous peoples occupied this area. Some came from the interior to gather dried salt. Historically, the Jirajara Indians traveled to Valencia Lake and through the mountains to reach the sea in this area to collect dried salt.

During 16th-century Spanish colonization, the explorer Juan de Villegas founded the town in 1548. During the late 16th and 17th centuries, the region suffered many attacks by French and British pirates. These included:

 1555: French pirates attacked Borburata for 6 days.
 1561: Lope de Aguirre and his maranones attacked Borburata after plundering Isla Margarita.
 1564: British pirates led by John Hawkins and his second cousin Francis Drake forced the Borburata settlers to buy his cargo of African slaves and goods as part of the Triangular trade.
 1566: Lowe attacked Borburata.
 1567: French pirates led by Nicolas Vallier invaded Borburata, and the residents had to abandon the town.
 1568: John Hawkins attacked Borburata again, forcing residents to buy his cargo. This included some of the 400 Africans he had captured and enslaved in West Africa.

The town of Borburata was eventually abandoned for a long period, and settlers moved to Valencia and Puerto Cabello. A day's walk from the Caribbean Sea, it was less likely to be raided.

Contemporary
Today Borburata is best known for the PDVSA tank farm, part of the profitable oil and gas industry. The town is also known for its religious festivities. The San Esteban National Park located  minutes outside the town contains a great variety of habitats, such as beaches, mangroves, coral reefs, and tropical rainforests, with corresponding diversity of wildlife and plants.

Populated places established in 1548
1548 establishments in the Spanish Empire